Moore Township is a township in Barber County, Kansas, USA.  As of the 2000 census, its population was 32.

Geography

References
 USGS Geographic Names Information System (GNIS)

External links
 US-Counties.com
 City-Data.com

Townships in Barber County, Kansas
Townships in Kansas